A hell-fire trigger is a device that allows a semi-automatic firearm to fire at an increased rate. The hell-fire clamps to the trigger guard behind the trigger and presses a "finger" against the back of the trigger to increase the force that returns the trigger to its forward position, effectively decreasing the time required for the trigger to reset, allowing for a faster follow up shot.

Internally, the firearm is not altered. As in all semi-automatic firearms, only one round is fired with every stroke of the trigger. 

The most notorious instance of the Hell-Fire trigger being used is the Waco siege; David Koresh, leader of the Branch Davidians, reportedly told authorities that he utilized semi-automatic guns with the part installed. Another well-known case of its use is the 101 California Street shooting.

See also
 Bump stock

References

External links
AK-47.net: Hell Fire Trigger System

Firearm components